Bláskógabyggð is a municipality located in western Iceland. Its major settlements are Laugarás and Laugarvatn. The municipality was formed in 2002 after the merger of Laugardalshreppur, Biskupstungnahreppur and Þingvallahreppur.

References

External links 

Official website 

Municipalities of Iceland